Two ships of the Royal Navy have borne the name HMS Exmoor, after the Exmoor fox hunt:

  was a  launched in 1940 and sunk in 1941.
She was launched in 1941, transferred to the Royal Danish Navy in 1952 as HDMS Valdemar Sejr and sold for breaking up in 1966.

Royal Navy ship names